A Gangstergirl is a 1966 Dutch drama film directed by Frans Weisz. It was entered into the 17th Berlin International Film Festival.

Plot
A popular young writer cannot decide which direction his life should go in. Should he stay at home with his wife and his typewriter? Travel to a movie-centric Italian town? He stays at the house of two gay friends while trying to figure this out.

Cast
 Paolo Graziosi - Wessel Franken
 Kitty Courbois
 Astrid Weyman - (as Asta Weyne)
 Gian Maria Volonté
 Walter Kous
 Joop van Hulzen - (as Joop van Hulsen)
 Dub Dubois
 Maurice Vrijdag
 Peter Schat
 Hans van den Bergh
 Lina Conti
 Nol Gregoor
 Henriette Klautz
 Peter Lohr
 Ilse Monsanto

References

External links

1966 films
1960s Dutch-language films
1966 drama films
Dutch black-and-white films
Films directed by Frans Weisz
Dutch drama films